Nonpareils are a decorative confectionery of tiny balls made with sugar and starch, traditionally an opaque white but now available in many colors. They are also known as hundreds and thousands in Australia, New Zealand, South Africa and the United Kingdom.

Their origin is uncertain, but they may have evolved out of the pharmaceutical use of sugar, as they were a miniature version of comfits. The French name has been interpreted to mean they were "without equal" for intricate decoration of cakes, desserts, and other sweets, and for the elaborate pièces montées constructed as table ornaments.

The term non pareil also may refer to a specific confection, made using non pareils – namely, discs of chocolate coated with nonpareils, which also are known as chocolate nonpareils, freckles, or jazzies.

History
An 18th-century American recipe for a frosted wedding cake calls for nonpareils as decoration. By the early 19th century, colored nonpareils seem to have been available in the U.S. The popular cookbook author Eliza Leslie suggests the use of red and green nonpareils for decorating a Queen cake, but strongly suggests white nonpareils are most suitable for pink icing on a pound cake in her 1828 Seventy-five Receipts for Pastries, Cakes and Sweetmeats.

In 1844, Eleanor Parkinson, of a well-known Philadelphia family of professional confectioners, first published her book The Complete Confectioner, in which she described how to make nonpareils following her comfit-making procedure, which involved multiple hot pots and hot syrup.

Görlitz, Germany was the birthplace of the German version of nonpareils, popularly known in Germany as Liebesperlen (German: love pearls). Invented by confectioner Rudolf Hoinkis (1876–1944), the name derives from a conversation Hoinkis had with his wife, proclaiming he loved her like these "pearls", the nonpareil. Unsure of what to call the treat he invented, his wife suggested calling them love pearls, and the name stuck. The factory where he first manufactured the treat, founded in 1896, is now run by his great-grandson, Mathias.

In the United States, traditional nonpareils gave way for most purposes by the mid 20th century to "sprinkles" (known in some parts as "jimmies"), confections nearly as small but usually oblong rather than round and soft rather than brittle. Like nonpareils, their function is more decorative than gustatory as their actual taste is indistinct, and the products they are applied to are usually themselves very high in sugar.

Candy-covered anise seeds called muisjes, sometimes mistaken for traditional nonpareils, are sometimes offered at breakfast in the Netherlands to be served on bread and butter. They are, however, usually served on rusk to celebrate the birth of a child. This is known as "beschuit met muisjes".

In Australia and New Zealand, as well as South Africa and the UK, spherical non pareils are known as "hundreds-and-thousands". In Australia and New Zealand, they are often used to decorate cup cakes (patty cakes) or toffee, or on buttered white bread triangles as fairy bread, for children's birthday parties.

Chocolate nonpareils
The term "nonpareils" can also refer to a specific confection: a round flat chocolate drop with the upper surface covered in nonpareils. This confection is also referred to as "chocolate non pareils". Ferrero makes a variety marketed in some countries as Sno-Caps.

In Australia, these confections are commonly known as "chocolate freckles", or simply "freckles". Non pareils are also sold in the United Kingdom as "Jazzies", "Jazzles", "Jazz drops" and "Snowies" (the latter being of the white chocolate variety).

The coating of non pareils is referred to as hundreds and thousands in Australia, New Zealand, South Africa, and the UK. The Canadian company Mondoux sells them as "Yummies".

See also 

 Confetti candy
 Dragée

References 

Sugar confectionery